The following is a list of reportedly haunted locations in the United Kingdom.

The kingdom is reputedly the most haunted landmass in the world, with England as the most haunted country, reporting the densest coverage of purported ghost sightings and paranormal experiences both per person, and by geographical area. Scotland, Wales, and Northern Ireland are also rich in ghost lore (though far less densely populated), and there is not a single village, town or city which does not have reportings of ghosts and ghost belief going back multiple centuries.

England 

 Ancient Ram Inn, in Gloucestershire. It has been featured on various paranormal television programmes.
 Belgrave Hall, in Leicester, attracted attention in 1999 when a white figure was captured on CCTV. One theory is it is the daughter of a former owner.

 Borley Rectory in the village of Borley, Essex, England. No longer extant.
 Brislington, once an attractive Somerset village but now a neighbourhood in Bristol, is reputed to have many ghosts.
 Chillingham Castle, a medieval castle in Chillingham, Northumberland. 
 Dartmouth, Devon, ancient maritime town has many ghost stories.
 Flitwick Manor in Bedfordshire, reputedly haunted and appeared on Strange but True? in 1995.
 Hoghton Tower, a historic house and stately home in the village of Hoghton, Preston is the second most haunted place in England.
 Minsden Chapel, a ruin in Hertfordshire, is reputed to be visited at midnight on All Hallows Eve by a ghostly monk who climbs now-vanished stairs while the lost bells toll.
 Renishaw Hall, a stately home in Derbyshire.
 Royal Court Theatre in Liverpool. It was visited by paranormal investigators on Most Haunted.

Buckinghamshire

Chenies Manor House, a country house in the village of Chenies.
The Chequers Inn, a pub in the town of Amersham.
Cock Lane, a street in the town of High Wycombe.
The Crown Inn, a pub in the village of Penn.
Finnamore Wood, a forest near the village of Marlow.
Four Ashes Road, in the village of Hughenden Valley.
Fulmer, a village near the town of Gerrards Cross.
Gerrards Cross, a town in south-east Buckinghamshire.
The George and Dragon, a pub in the village of West Wycombe.
The Greyhound Inn, a pub in the village of Chalfont St Peter.
High Wycombe railway station, in the town of High Wycombe.
Medmenham Abbey, a country house near the village of Medmenham.
Missenden Abbey, a country house in the village of Great Missenden.
The Royal Standard of England, a pub in the hamlet of Forty Green.
St Lawrence's Church, in the village of West Wycombe.
St Bartholomew's Church, in the village of Fingest.
The White Hart, a pub in the village of Chalfont St Peter.

Lincolnshire

Bradley Woods, a forest near the village of Bradley, its haunted by the Black Lady of Bradley Woods
RAF East Kirkby, a former airfield near the village of East Kirkby.
RAF Elsham Wolds, a former airfield near the village of Elsham.
RAF Metheringham, a former airfield near the village of Metheringham.

London

50 Berkeley Square, a townhouse in the City of Westminster.
The British Museum 
Brookside Theatre, in the borough of Havering.
Bruce Castle, a manor house in the borough of Haringey.
284 Green Street, a council house in the borough of Enfield.
Cock Lane, a street in the City of London.
Hall Place, in the London Borough of Bexley.
Hampton Court Palace, a royal palace in the borough of Richmond upon Thames.
Langham Hotel, a hotel in the City of Westminster.
Tower of London, a castle in the borough of Tower Hamlets.
Theatre Royal, Drury Lane, a theatre haunted by the "Man in Grey".

The New Forest

Angel & Blue Pig, a coaching inn in Lymington
Beaulieu Abbey, a ruined Cistercian Abbey in Beaulieu
Beaulieu Palace House, the seat of Baron Montagu of Beaulieu
Bolton's Bench, a hill surrounded in dragon folklore outside Lyndhurst
Breamore House, an Elizabethan manor house built on the site of Breamore Priory
Fleur de Lys, the oldest pub in the New Forest, at Pilley
Fox and Hounds, an 18th-century coaching inn on the High Street, Lyndhurst
Glasshayes House, a country house and former hotel redesigned by Arthur Conan Doyle in Lyndhurst
Hurst Castle, an artillery fort established by Henry VIII on the Hurst Spit
Red Lion Pub, Boldre
Rufus Stone, a stone that marks the traditional site of the killing of William Rufus, outside Minstead
Waterloo Arms, a 16th-century thatched pub in Pikes Hill, Lyndhurst

Norfolk

RAF Bircham Newton, a former airfield near the village of Docking.
Raynham Hall, a country house near the village of East Raynham
Maids Head Hotel, a hotel in the City of Norwich

Warwickshire

 Edge Hill, a hamlet in southern Warwickshire.
 Ettington Park, a country house in the village of Ettington.
 Coombe Abbey, a former abbey which is now a hotel, located in the civil parish of Combe Fields

Northern Ireland 

Ballygally Castle
Springhill – the 17th-century Plantation House, home for nearly 300 years of the Lenox-Conyngham family.

Scotland

Wales

 In Llanfihangel Crucorney, The Skirrid Mountain Inn, one of the oldest public houses in Wales, is reputed to be home to several ghosts.
 Llancaiach Fawr is a Tudor manor house near Nelson in the Caerphilly County Borough. In 2007, the Guardian listed Llancaiach as one of the top ten haunted places in the United Kingdom.
 Plas Teg is a Jacobean house located near the village of Pontblyddyn between Wrexham and Mold. The house has featured on Living's Most Haunted programme on two occasions.  The second occasion was featured as part of the Halloween Most Haunted Live! series on 31 October 2007. It was also featured in Ghost Hunting With... Girls Aloud in 2006, where the girls visited the house as their first location, where they claimed to have experienced paranormal activity.

See also

List of ghosts
List of Most Haunted episodes
List of reportedly haunted locations in the world
Reportedly haunted locations in Canada
Reportedly haunted locations in the United States

References

 
Haunted